The 2003 Louisiana–Lafayette Ragin' Cajuns football team represented the University of Louisiana at Lafayette as a member of the Sun Belt Conference in the 2003 NCAA Division I-A football season. They were led by second-year head coach Rickey Bustle and  played their home games at Cajun Field in Lafayette, Louisiana.

Schedule

References

Louisiana–Lafayette
Louisiana Ragin' Cajuns football seasons
Louisiana–Lafayette Ragin' Cajuns football